Vanvitellii can refer to:

 Caspar van Wittel, painter of Baroque vedute
 Luigi Vanvitelli, prominent 18th-century Baroque and Neoclassical architect of Rome and Naples
 Piazza Vanvitelli, a public square in Vomero, Naples
 Vanvitelli (Naples Metro), a station on Line 1 of the Naples metro